Sarcopetalum is a genus of flowering plants belonging to the family Menispermaceae.

Species
Its native range is New Guinea to Eastern and Southeastern Australia.

Species:
 Sarcopetalum harveyanum F.Muell.

References

Menispermaceae
Menispermaceae genera